Joseph Runningfox (born 1955 in Santa Fe, New Mexico) is a Pueblo actor.

He was featured in Ravenous as George (credited as Joseph Running Fox) and is a member of the Screen Actors Guild.

Runningfox played Geronimo in a 1993 television movie of the same name.  It premiered on TNT five days before Geronimo: An American Legend was released theatrically and was shot in Tucson, Arizona.

He is currently a resident of Las Vegas, Nevada.

Theatrical Roles
Not One More Foot of Land  Major Ridge (2012) directed by Kristina Lloyd

Filmography

References

External links

Joseph Runningfox My Space page
Joseph Runningfox Native Celeb Profile

American male film actors
Living people
1955 births